The Next Chapter is an extended play by Canadian country artist Don Amero. It was released on September 25, 2020 through MDM Recordings. It features the singles "Music Lover", "Morning Coffee", "Wouldn't Be Home", and "Wasn't the Dress".

Track listing

Charts

Singles

References

2020 EPs
MDM Recordings albums
Folk rock albums by Canadian artists